Sabatieria furcillata is a nematode in the family Comesomatidae ranking. It was described in 1954 by the Austrian zoologist .

References 

Nematodes
Nematoida